This is a list of tunnels documented by the Historic American Engineering Record in the U.S. state of West Virginia.

Tunnels

See also
List of bridges documented by the Historic American Engineering Record in West Virginia

References

Tunnels
Tunnels
West Virginia